List of television series about the Korean War

 M*A*S*H (TV series) (US)
 Mad Men (US) 
 Legend of the Patriots (ROK)
 Junwoo (1975–78) (ROK)
 Road No. 1 (ROK)